The  Tampa Bay Storm season was the 23rd season for the franchise in the Arena Football League. The team was coached by Tim Marcum and played their home games at the St. Pete Times Forum.

Standings

Regular season schedule

The Storm opened the season on the road against the Talons on April 3. Their first home game of the season was in Week 3 against the Vigilantes. The conclusion of the regular season was at the St. Pete Times Forum in Week 18 against the Predators in another edition of The War on I-4, on July 31.

All times are EDT

Playoff schedule

All times are EDT

Roster

Regular season

Week 1: at Tulsa Talons

In a game that saw neither team have consecutive scores until the 4th quarter, the Storm were defeated 69–58 after giving up two late touchdowns and being unable to mount a final comeback. The Storm committed just two turnovers in the game, but were unable to force any turnovers of their own. Quarterback Brett Dietz threw for 346 yards and 8 touchdowns, while wide receiver Tyrone Timmons had 181 yards on 11 catches and 5 touchdowns.

Week 2: BYE

Week 3: vs. Dallas Vigilantes

A goal-line stand near the end of the 1st half helped the Storm earn their first win of the season. With under a minute left in the half, the Storm defense stopped Dallas on a 4th and goal from the 1-yard line. Following the change of possession, quarterback Brett Dietz found Tyrone Timmons in the end zone on the sixth play of the ensuing drive to give Tampa Bay the lead at halftime, which was also their first lead of the game. After trailing by a single point for a brief time in the 3rd quarter, the Storm quickly retook the lead and never gave it back to their opponent, defeating the Vigilantes 54–41. Dietz finished with 320 passing yards and 6 touchdowns. Timmons led all receivers with 108 yards and 4 touchdowns.

Week 4: at Milwaukee Iron

Second half turnovers cost the Storm the game in which they led at halftime. Perhaps the most costly turnover was early in the 4th quarter when Tampa Bay had just been given a 1st and goal following a Milwaukee penalty. Cleannord Saintil fumbled the ball inside the Milwaukee 3-yard line, which was recovered by the Iron's Eric Turner. The Iron took full advantage of the miscue with a touchdown drive capped off by a Chris Greisen touchdown run. This put the Storm behind by 11 points, and they were unable to make up the deficit. Brett Dietz threw for 316 yards and 7 touchdowns in the loss, while Saintil led all receivers with 128 yards on 9 receptions and 4 receiving touchdowns.

Week 5: vs. Arizona Rattlers

The Storm led for almost the entire game, but continued to allow Arizona to creep back into it. Following a fumble recovered by the Rattlers in the 4th quarter, they tied the game at 48–48 on a 12-yard passing touchdown just a few plays later. The Storm would score a touchdown on their next drive with a 10-yard reception by Tyrone Timmons, however kicker Garrett Rivas missed the extra point. The Rattlers would find the end zone on their next play from scrimmage, and with a successful extra point, took their first lead of the night at 55–54. Tampa Bay would retake the lead on a 37-yard pass by Brett Dietz to DeAndrew Rubin. Instead of trying an extra point this time, the Storm went for a two-point conversion. The pass from Dietz to Terrence Royal was successful, putting the Storm ahead 62–55 with 1:25 left for the Rattlers. Arizona put together a 5-play, 46-yard drive in which they never faced a 3rd down, ending in a 3-yard passing touchdown with 7 seconds remaining. They went for two instead of the tie, which would have likely forced overtime, but their attempt was unsuccessful. The Storm recovered the onside kick that ensued and ran out the clock to end the game, winning 72–71. Dietz finished with 288 yards and a season-high 9 touchdowns. His most frequent receiver was DeAndrew Rubin, who caught 9 passes for 184 yards and 5 touchdowns.

For Tim Marcum, the win was his 200th in his career as a head coach in the AFL.

Week 6: vs. Jacksonville Sharks

The game, while low scoring, was tight throughout the night, as neither team led by more than 6 points at any time. The Storm were up by 5 points in the final minute after a Tyrone Timmons 11-yard touchdown catch, but Tampa Bay's defense gave up a touchdown on the Sharks' ensuing drive. Down 46–43 and having 36 seconds to work with on the clock, DeAndrew Rubin fumbled 15 yards from the end zone after catching a pass. The loose ball was recovered by the Sharks, who ran out the clock to end the game. It was Tampa Bay's fifth giveaway in the game. Brett Dietz threw 2 interceptions along with his 293 passing yards and 5 touchdowns. Despite the late turnover, Rubin was the team's leading receiver with 147 yards and a pair of touchdown receptions.

Week 7: at Bossier–Shreveport Battle Wings

Week 8: BYE

Week 9: at Orlando Predators

Week 10: vs. Oklahoma City Yard Dawgz

Week 11: at Alabama Vipers

Week 12: at Utah Blaze

Week 13: vs. Bossier–Shreveport Battle Wings

Week 14: vs. Chicago Rush

Week 15: at Dallas Vigilantes

With their eighth consecutive win, the Storm clinched a playoff berth.

Week 16: at Jacksonville Sharks

Week 17: vs. Alabama Vipers

Week 18: vs. Orlando Predators

The Storm looked to take their second win in The War on I-4 in 2010. They entered the game having already known the Jacksonville Sharks wrapped up the division championship with a win the night before. This meant that win or lose to the Preds, the Storm would be heading to Tulsa for the conference semifinals against the Talons. 

Still, the Storm fell behind early against the Predators as quarterback Brett Dietz threw two interceptions in the 1st quarter, and Orlando capitalized on both turnovers with a pair of touchdown drives. In the second quarter, both teams scored two touchdowns each, but the Predators took a 45–20 lead into halftime with a 23-yard field goal as time expired. The closest Tampa Bay would get in the 2nd half was a 15-point deficit, after a 7-yard Hank Edwards touchdown reception with 14 seconds left in the 4th quarter, losing the game 75–60. Head coach Tim Marcum commented after the game, "It was a butt whipping, and we supplied the butt." 

Dietz's 310 passing yards gave him 5,054 for the season, a new single-season record for Tampa Bay. His six touchdown passes raised his season total to 106, another single-season record that had already been surpassed by the quarterback in the weeks before. DeAndrew Rubin was the leading receiver in the game, and also set a couple of single-game records for the Storm with 17 receptions and 245 yards.

The game itself took an ugly turn shortly before halftime because of an altercation between fans and two Orlando players. Center Julius Wilson reportedly attempted to toss a football to his father in the stands behind the Predator bench, however a fan knocked the ball away from the hands of Wilson's father, and as other fans scrambled to get the ball, Wilson's father was knocked down. Receiver Bobby Sippio went into the seats as his own father was near the area of the incident. Wilson eventually went into the stands as well, and threw a punch at a fan, which resulted in a fight breaking out. Both players were ejected from the game and were given suspensions. Sippio, who was given a suspension of one game, appealed, allowing him to participate in the playoffs. Wilson was given a six game suspension that he was not allowed to appeal because it was not his first ejection that season. Ten fans were also escorted away. No arrests were made.

Playoffs

American Conference Semifinals: at Tulsa Talons

American Conference Championship: vs. Orlando Predators

ArenaBowl XXIII: at Spokane Shock

References

Tampa Bay Storm
Tampa Bay Storm seasons
Tampa